The Mouths of Madness is the second studio album by American doom metal band Orchid.

Tour
To promote the album, Orchid went on a headlining tour with Blues Pills and Scorpion Child.

Track listing

Personnel
Orchid
Theo Mindell – vocals, synthesizer, percussion
Mark Thomas Baker – guitars
Keith Nickel – bass guitar
Carter Kennedy – drums

Additional musicians
Will Storkson – keyboards, synthesizer, percussion

References

External links
The Mouths of Madness by Orchid on Nuclear Blast's website
"The Mouths of Madness" overview, AllMusic

2013 albums
Orchid (heavy metal band) albums
Nuclear Blast albums